Micromyrtus fimbrisepala is a plant species of the family Myrtaceae endemic to Western Australia.

It blooms between July and October producing pink flowers.

It is found on sand dunes in the eastern Goldfields-Esperance region of Western Australia extending into South Australia where it grows in sandy soils.

References

fimbrisepala
Flora of Western Australia
Plants described in 1980